Zakaki is one of the quarters of Limassol municipality on the island of Cyprus. It is the westernmost part of the municipality. It started as a village. In 1972 it was incorporated with the Limassol Municipality and since then it is one of the quarters of the city's central municipality. According to the 2011 census, Zakaki had 5,874 inhabitants.

References 

Quarters of Limassol